The Ohio Casino Control Commission (OCCC) is a gaming control board in Ohio that provides oversight of the state's casinos.

History 
In 1990, several Ohio cities filed petitions to the Ohio General Assembly to authorize casino gambling in the state and establish an independent agency to regulate the industry.

The commission was created in 2011 with the passage of Ohio's Casino Control Law in 2011.

Composition 
The commission is bipartisan and composed of seven commissioners appointed by the governor of Ohio with the advice and consent of the Ohio Senate.

Activities 
The Commission is authorized to license, regulate, investigate, and exert jurisdiction over all people engaging in casino gaming in Ohio. The Commission adopts administrative rules and resolutions which establish the standards and procedures for casino operators, vendors, and licensed gaming industry employees.

References

External links 
 

State agencies of Ohio
State departments of commerce of the United States
State law enforcement agencies of Ohio
Gambling regulators in the United States